The Elder Scrolls III: Tribunal is an expansion for The Elder Scrolls III: Morrowind by Bethesda Softworks, released on November 6, 2002. The expansion takes place in the city of Mournhold, the capital of Morrowind, and further explores the  story of the three "Living Gods", known as the Tribunal.

Gameplay

Tribunal is set in Mournhold, a self-contained city. Mournhold is not a contiguous part of the game world in Morrowind, and players are required to access the area through teleportation, with certain features such as levitation disabled to conceal the separation from the game world. Access to the content in Tribunal is possible after the player first goes to sleep, which will trigger the initial quest leading the player to be teleported to Mournhold.

The most notable aspect of Tribunal is the modification of Morrowind'''s journal system. In the original game, the journal records entries in a linear fashion, which can become extremely lengthy and cumbersome. Tribunal allows a player to sort their journal by quest (instead of chronologically sorted) in order to determine what is required for a specific quest. Another notable feature of the expansion is the Museum of Artifacts. The owner of the museum will pay the player half of the value of an artifact for one of the very rare artifacts found in the original game. Other novel features to Tribunal include a hireable follower and pack rat that can travel with the player.

Plot

The player is attacked by an assassin, later revealed to be a member of the Dark Brotherhood, an assassin's guild that spans Tamriel. To find out more about the Dark Brotherhood, the player is sent to Mournhold, the capital of Morrowind. Once in Mournhold, the player locates the head of the Dark Brotherhood and completes a series of side quests for the new King Helseth, and the Living God Almalexia. Almalexia has ruled Morrowind for thousands of years alongside her fellow gods Vivec and Sotha Sil, who call themselves the Tribunal, and are worshipped by the Dark Elf people.

During the player's visit to Mournhold, a group of mechanical creatures called Fabricants suddenly attacks the Plaza Brindisi Dorom area. The creatures emerge from the statue in the middle of the plaza, revealing a secret passageway to a Dwemer ruin. Since the creatures are mechanical, it is suspected that the secretive god Sotha Sil is behind this attack. The player investigates the ruins and completes further quests in order to reconstruct Nerevar's lost sword called Trueflame. Upon acquiring the sword, the player is sent to the Clockwork City in order to kill Sotha Sil.

The player explores Clockwork City, finally arriving to find Sotha Sil dead. Upon leaving, Almalexia appears and alleges that she had killed Sotha Sil and instigated the attack in Mournhold, in order to gain more power and control over the citizens and the Tribunal. Driven mad by the Heart of Lorkhan, Almalexia perceived Sotha Sil's silence as mockery. The player is then forced to kill her before returning to Mournhold.

As the player exits Almalexia's temple in Mournhold, the Daedric Prince Azura reveals that the Heart of Lorkhan drove Almalexia mad and made her hunger for more power, and that mere mortals cannot become gods without consequences. By destroying the Heart of Lorkhan and killing Almalexia, the player continues fulfilling the Nerevarine prophecies, particularly the death of the Almsivi Tribunal.

Development

HistoryTribunal was inspired by the intended title of an unfinished attempt by Bethesda Softworks to create a third Elder Scrolls game in 1996. This title was intended to be set in another province of Tamriel, the Summerset Isle, and follow on from the story of Daggerfall. Lead designer Ken Rolston stated that "(Tribunal's) basic design dates back to 1996, when we nobly and naively imagined we could create the entire land mass of Morrowind in a single game," and that "the conflicts, characters and themes of the main quest line are part of the original game design from years and years ago." Julian Le Fay has stated that whilst "the name Tribunal was from early discussions" on the sequel to Daggerfall, "at that time it was still fuzzy exactly what it was supposed to be" and "none of the people involved in those discussions ended up working on Morrowind".

Whilst Tribunal is not directly connected to earlier Elder Scrolls games, it does contain inspiration and content from earlier titles, including adamantium armor, and monsters including goblins and liches. Mournhold, the setting of Tribunal, is also featured as a location in The Elder Scrolls: Arena. Arena's description of "a great evil (that) resides under (Mournhold), slowly driving its citizens mad," loosely relates to the plot of Tribunal in its depiction of the Clockwork City.

Development

Development on Tribunal started immediately after the release of Morrowind. The expansion was completed in a five-month development cycle from June 2002, with the expansion completed for testing in October 2002. Development of Tribunal was expedited by the inclusion of the Construction Set, providing the development team with "the tools in place to add content and features very quickly." The Tribunal development team was a smaller team of 15 to 25 consisting of the 40 Bethesda Softworks staff involved in the creation of Morrowind.

Initial work on Tribunal was strained, Development occurring immediately after the release of Morrowind left team members "pretty fried", with lead designer Ken Rolston expressing becoming "really sick of (the game)" during the development cycle. Creative differences between Ken Rolston and Doug Goodall lead to the departure of the latter during initial development meetings.

The Tribunal questline was conceived of as being accessible to all players irrespective of level or status. Todd Howard described the expansion as an "add-in rather than an add-on", nothing that "any character can play (Tribunal) at any time". However, the game was intended as "geared towards higher-level characters" to meet the "need to offer (players) a new challenge".Tribunal's setting, Mournhold, was deliberately separated from the setting of Vvardenfell in Morrowind, requiring players to teleport between the two locations. Designer Mark Nelson stated this decision was intentional, as "the original island is pretty content-rich now and we didn't want to introduce overlapping content, either with our work or the work of the mod community". Todd Howard added "we didn't want to mess with the sanctity of the game that is already out there."

The narrative of Tribunal is strongly anchored by two of the titular god-kings of Morrowind, Amalexia and Sotha Sil, who did not appear in the original game. Designer Mark Nelson stated that initial development of Tribunal's setting involved discussion around "elements we felt weren't fully explored in Morrowind itself". Todd Howard discussed: "we really wanted to follow up on the other two members of the Tribunal, (who) get mentioned often in Morrowind, but there wasn't a real resolution to what happens to them, so that was a story we felt needed exploring."Tribunal includes the addition of minor changes to the game. The most significant change consisted of alterations to Morrowind's interface, including sortable quests and map notes. These features were based on player feedback, with Todd Howard noting the journal "definitely was...everyone's biggest complaint. I underestimated just how many quests people would get and do at once." Otherwise, the development team attempted to gameplay modifications similar to player-created material.

Release

The expansion was announced on September 6, 2002, and released on November 6, 2002 in North America. Despite initial statements by Bethesda Softworks that Tribunal would not be released on the Xbox, the expansion, along with its successor, The Elder Scrolls III: Bloodmoon, was packaged as Morrowind: Game of the Year Edition for Windows and Xbox on October 31, 2003.

Reception

ReviewsTribunal was generally well received by game reviewers. Among aggregate review sites, Metacritic scored the PC version of the game with an 80 out of 100, and GameRankings scored the game at 81 out of 100.

Updates to the interface and quest journal system were praised as necessary changes to Morrowind's mechanics. Shakil Ahmed of Hyper noted the expansion "alleviates some of the woes" of the "messy journal system that didn't help to sort through the piles of plot fragments" in the original game. Computer Gaming World noted that the quest system "isn't tremendously helpful because the title of a particular quest isn't always obvious, but it's an improvement over the unbearably messy journal in the original."

Reviewers were mixed about the narrower design of the expansion's setting. Keith Pullin of PC Zone critiqued the expansion as "a relatively linear affair", noting "Tribunal offers none of the sense of scale that made Morrowind such an awe-inspiring experience." Computer Gaming World similarly stated "it's somewhat strange that Tribunal...is so confining: most of your exploits are confined to a single city," also critiquing the "underpopulated" nature of Mournhold.

In contrast, some reviewers praised the more focused structure and narrative of the expansion. Steve Polak of PC Powerplay noted "(Tribunal) might be just the ticket if you found the original game too open ended and unstructured", praising the game as "easier to follow with a better sense of direction." Steve Butts of IGN stated "the singular, shorter main quest allows for much better pacing, and unlike Morrowind, you'll rarely lose sight of what you're doing or why. For players who were intimidated by the openness of Morrowind, this is much more comprehensible."

Reviewers generally welcomed the more difficult gameplay in Tribunal. Computer Gaming World stated "the new monsters...make for challenging opponents, and Tribunal is a great place for high-level characters to continue their adventures". Some reviewers found the expansion slightly too difficult, with William Abner of GameSpy found the expansion "no cakewalk even with some of the more powerful items of the original game".

The poor pathfinding of the travelling companion and pack rat was noted by several reviewers. William Abner of GameSpy stated "while the companions are a great idea in theory, in practice they're a big pain", noting annoyance due to "pathing problems" and "clipping issues". Steve Polak ofPC Powerplay critiqued the game's code as "still far from perfect...NPCs have an annoying habit of not navigating with the most intelligence (and) they get stuck on corners or wander into danger."

Some reviewers encountered technical problems with the expansion. Steve Butts of IGN observed a "fair amount of crash bugs" when playing the game. William Abner of GameSpy stated "Tribunal introduces a few bizarre sound problems, such as invisible monsters and an incessant thumping sound."

Legacy

Todd Howard retrospectively remarked on lessons learned from the development of Tribunal. He noted Tribunal had greater difficulty for players than intended, as fewer enemies scaled to the player's level, reflecting that "Tribunal had too many hard enemies." He also noted that "one of the comments we got about Tribunal was that it didn't have wilderness exploration", referencing the self-contained area of Mournhold, which lacked open areas in favor of dungeons.

The following expansion pack for Morrowind, The Elder Scrolls III: Bloodmoon, was released on June 3, 2003. Tribunal was influential in the direction taken for the expansion. Pete Hines stated the design approach for Bloodmoon reflected a desire to "get away from the political themes in Tribunal" and provide players with a more open-ended area "with lots of creatures and dungeons and loot". Project lead Ashley Cheng noted the development team were "more conscious of levelling stuff for The Elder Scrolls III: Bloodmoon," reflecting that "Tribunal'' was pretty tough for level 20 characters and below".

References

External links 

2002 video games
Action role-playing video games
Single-player video games
Tribunal
Video game expansion packs
Video games developed in the United States
Video games featuring protagonists of selectable gender
Windows games
Xbox games
Bethesda Game Studios games
Open-world video games